Bootle is a town in Sefton, Merseyside, England.  It contains 18 buildings that are recorded in the National Heritage List for England as designated listed buildings, Of these, one is  listed at Grade I, the highest of the three grades, one is at Grade II*, the middle grade, and the others are at Grade II, the lowest grade.  Bootle was a bathing resort in the early 19th century.  Between 1860 and 1900 its population increased nearly ten-fold, due to the building of the Leeds and Liverpool Canal and the extension of the docks.  Before this time, the only listed buildings are those relating to a shooting lodge of the Earl of Derby.  The main civic buildings, most of which are no longer used for their original purposes, date from the later years of the 19th century.  The other listed buildings are churches, buildings associated with the docks, a statue, and a war memorial.


Key

Buildings

References
Citations

Sources

Listed buildings in Merseyside
Lists of listed buildings in Merseyside
Bootle